The College World Series (CWS), officially the NCAA Men's College World Series (MCWS), is an annual baseball tournament held in June in Omaha, Nebraska. The MCWS is the culmination of the National Collegiate Athletic Association (NCAA) Division I Baseball Championship tournament—featuring 64 teams in the first round—which determines the NCAA Division I college baseball champion. The eight participating teams are split into two, four-team, double-elimination brackets, with the winners of each bracket playing in a best-of-three championship series.

History
The first edition of the College World Series was held in 1947 at Hyames Field in Kalamazoo, Michigan. The tournament was held there again in 1948, but was moved to Lawrence Stadium in Wichita, Kansas for the 1949 tournament. Since 1950, the College World Series (CWS) has been held in Omaha, Nebraska. It was held at Rosenblatt Stadium from 1950 through 2010; starting in 2011, it has been held at Charles Schwab Field Omaha (formerly TD Ameritrade Park Omaha). The name "College World Series" is derived from that of the Major League Baseball World Series championship; it is currently an MLB trademark licensed to the NCAA.

The event's official name was changed to "Men's College World Series" no later than 2008. The most recent hosting agreement between the NCAA and the city of Omaha and related entities, signed in that year, states, "The official name of the [championship] shall be the NCAA Men's College World Series". However, as of October 2021, the CWS logo still appeared on the NCAA's official D-I baseball tournament bracket, and on the front page of the NCAA's official CWS website, without the word "Men's". The NCAA has since added "Men's" to the event's logo, and both the NCAA and College World Series of Omaha, Inc. (CWS Omaha), the nonprofit group that organizes the event, now consistently use the phrase "Men's College World Series" to describe it.

On March 13, 2020, it was announced that the 2020 College World Series was canceled due to the COVID-19 pandemic, the first time in the event's history it had been canceled.

Contract extension
On June 10, 2008, the NCAA and CWS Omaha announced a new 25-year contract extension, keeping the MCWS in Omaha through 2035.  A memorandum of understanding had been reached by all parties on April 30.

The currently binding contract began in 2011, the same year the tournament moved from Johnny Rosenblatt Stadium to the venue now known as Charles Schwab Field Omaha, a new ballpark across from CHI Health Center Omaha.

Format history and changes

 1947 – Eight teams were divided into two, four-team, single-elimination playoffs. The two winners then met in a best-of-three final in Kalamazoo, Michigan.
 1948 – Similar to 1947, but the two, four-team playoffs were changed to double-elimination tournaments. Again in the finals, the two winners met in a best-of-three format in Kalamazoo.
 1949 – The final was expanded to a four-team, double-elimination format and the site changed to Wichita, Kansas. Eight teams began the playoffs with the four finalists decided by a best-of-three district format.
 1950–1987 – An eight-team, double-elimination format for the College World Series coincided with the move to Omaha, Nebraska in 1950. From 1950 to 1953, a baseball committee chose one team from each of the eight NCAA districts to compete at the CWS, which constituted the entire Division I tournament, as there were no preliminary rounds (in 1948 and 1949, a selection committee in each of the eight districts chose its district representative based on the committee's own criteria, which might or might not include committee selections, conference champions, and district playoffs). Through 1987 the College World Series was a pure double-elimination event. That ended with the 1987 College World Series. In 1954, the Division I tournament began having preliminary rounds to determine the eight CWS teams. From 1954 to 1975, the number of teams in the first round of the overall tournament ranged from 21 to 32. The number of first-round teams was increased to 34 in 1976, 36 in 1982, 38 in 1985, 40 in 1986, and 48 in 1987.
 1988–1998 – The format was changed beginning with the 1988 College World Series, when the tournament was divided into 2 four-team double-elimination brackets, with the survivors of each bracket playing in a single championship game. The single-game championship was designed for network television, with the final game on CBS on a Saturday afternoon.
Before expanding to 64 teams in 1999, the 1998 Division I tournament began with 48 teams, split into 8 six-team regionals. The 8 regional winners advanced to the College World Series. The regionals were a test of endurance, as teams had to win at least four games over four days, sometimes five if a team dropped into the loser's bracket, placing a premium on pitching. In the last two years of the six-team regional format, the eventual CWS champion – LSU in 1997 and Southern California in 1998 – had to battle back from the loser's bracket in the regional to advance to Omaha.
 1999–2002 – With some 293 Division I teams playing, the NCAA expanded the overall tournament to a 64-team Regional field in 1999—with 8 National Seed teams (the top 8 seeds)—divided into 16 four-team regionals (each region seeded 1 to 4).  The winners of the 16 "Regionals" advance to a second round, consisting of 8 two-team, best-of-three-format "Super Regionals". (The National Seed teams that win their regional bracket are placed in different Super Regionals, so that no National Seed teams meet each other in a Super Regional.) The 8 Super Regional winners advance to the CWS in Omaha. While the CWS format remained the same, the expanded field meant that the eight CWS teams now are determined by the second-round Super Regionals. The 64-team bracket is set at the beginning of the championship and teams are not reseeded for the CWS. Since the 1999 College World Series, the four-team brackets in the CWS have been determined by the results of super-regional play, much like the NCAA basketball tournament. Before 1999, the four-team brackets were determined by the regional tournaments.
 2003–present – The championship final became a best-of-three series between the two four-team bracket winners, with games scheduled for three consecutive evenings. In the results shown below, Score indicates the score of the championship game(s) only. In 2008, the start of the CWS was moved back one day, and an extra day of rest was added in between bracket play and the championship series.

Results

Teams reaching the finals

Best performances by conference

 CIBA was California Intercollegiate Baseball Association that competed as a division under the Pacific Coast Conference which operated under its own Charter.
 Independents = Miami Hurricanes (4) and Holy Cross Crusaders (1)
 SCBA was Southern California Baseball Association (1977–84).
 The Big 12 does not claim any national championships, including baseball, that were won as members of the Big Eight and makes no claim to the history or records of the Big Eight.
 The Western Athletic Conference claims 7 national championships in baseball by former members. There are no gaps in its existence; the WAC has existed continuously since its formation in 1962.
 Coastal Carolina won the 2016 CWS as a member of the Big South Conference less than 24 hours before officially joining the Sun Belt Conference.
 Missouri won the 1954 CWS as a member of the Big Eight Conference.

Awards
The College World Series Most Outstanding Player award is presented to the best player at each College World Series finals (first awarded in 1949).

An All-Tournament Team consisting of the best players of the tournament has also been announced for each tournament since 1958.

Records and statistics

All-time record for champions

Most appearances without a CWS championship

Most CWS participants by one conference in a year

See also

 List of college baseball awards
 National Club Baseball Association
 NCAA Division II Baseball Championship
 NCAA Division III Baseball Championship
 Pre-NCAA baseball champion
 U.S. college baseball awards
 Women's College World Series

Notes

References

External links
 College World Series of Omaha (CWS Omaha, Inc.) official website
 Men's College World Series (NCAA official website)

 
Sports in Omaha, Nebraska
Sports competitions in Nebraska
Recurring sporting events established in 1947
Baseball in Nebraska
Tourism in Omaha, Nebraska